Aloe ortholopha is an aloe native to open grassland at 1450–1525 meters altitude in the northern Great Dyke, Mvurwi Range, Zimbabwe.

References
 Kew entry
 The Plant List entry
 Catalogue of Life entry

ortholopha